Deoxyadenosine monophosphate (dAMP), also known as deoxyadenylic acid or deoxyadenylate in its conjugate acid and conjugate base forms, respectively, is a derivative of the common nucleic acid AMP, or adenosine monophosphate, in which the -OH (hydroxyl) group on the 2' carbon on the nucleotide's pentose has been reduced to just a hydrogen atom (hence the "deoxy-" part of the name).  Deoxyadenosine monophosphate is abbreviated dAMP.  It is a monomer used in DNA.

See also
Nucleic acid
DNA metabolism
Cofactor
Guanosine
Cyclic AMP (cAMP)
ATP

Sources
 

Nucleotides